Ross Flood (born 22 February 1952) is a New Zealand Paralympic boccia player. He was a bronze medallist at the 2004 Summer Paralympics. He also competed at the 2000 Summer Paralympics.

References

External links 
 
 

1952 births
Living people
Paralympic boccia players of New Zealand
Boccia players at the 2000 Summer Paralympics
Boccia players at the 2004 Summer Paralympics
Paralympic medalists in boccia
Paralympic silver medalists for New Zealand